Faceby is a small village and civil parish in the Hambleton district of North Yorkshire, England. It is at the north-west corner of the North York Moors and near Stokesley.

Overview

The name of the village derives from the Old Norse meaning "Feit's Settlement", with Feit being a personal name. It has one pub (The Sutton Arms),  a village hall, and a 12th-century church, St Mary Magdalene. Buses run to Northallerton and Stokesley three or four times a day.

References

External links

Villages in North Yorkshire
Civil parishes in North Yorkshire